The 1990–91 season was Sport Lisboa e Benfica's 87th season in existence and the club's 57th consecutive season in the top flight of Portuguese football, covering the period from 1 July 1990 to 30 June 1991. Benfica competed domestically in the Primeira Divisão and the Taça de Portugal, and participated in the UEFA Cup after finishing second in the previous league.

With only a Supertaça Cândido de Oliveira won in the past season, Benfica was keen on retake the Primeira Divisão title again. They were quickly eliminated from Europe at the hands of Roma, so all attentions were pointed on the league title. A strong campaign witnessed Benfica overtake Porto in February and then close the title with an away win in the Clássico, a controversial match because of the tactics employed by Porto to destabilize the team. On late May, Benfica secured their 29th league title, while Rui Águas won the Bola de Prata for league top-scorer.

Season summary
Benfica started the new season after having lost their fifth European Cup Final in the past season, while Porto regained the league title back. Swedish manager Sven-Göran Eriksson made some squad adjustments, releasing established players like Fernando Chalana, Diamantino Miranda and Álvaro Magalhães, and losing Aldair to Roma. He nearly lost Valdo too, but Benfica and Fiorentina failed to agree terms. To counter the departures, he brought back Rui Águas, from Porto, Neno from Vitória de Guimarães, alongside William, and also added Isaías and Stefan Schwarz. Tomas Brolin was also a target but Eriksson thought he was not ready to play for a club like Benfica.

The pre-season started in Portugal on 16 July, followed by a tour in Sweden from 22 July to 5 August. Benfica would then play a presentation game on the 9th with Belenenses, take part on the Teresa Herrera Trophy from 17 until 19th, and closed pre-season with a match against Roma on the 22nd. The league campaign started in the best of terms as the team racked up wins in September and October. However, in Europe Benfica did not fare as well and were knocked-out of the UEFA Cup by Roma in the first round.

With only the domestic competitions to fight for, Benfica lost for the first and only time in the league on 3 November in Setúbal. The local Vitória played very aggressively, injuring three players from Benfica within the first 35 minutes: first Stefan Schwarz, followed by Fernando Mendes and then Vítor Paneira. They were forced to play with only 10 men for remaining 55 minutes, since they spent its two substitutions on Schwarz and Mendes. Benfica reacted with four consecutive wins until the Clássico where it draw 2–2 in another violent match. They followed with an away win in Alvalade, but lost a point with Farense who played their home match in Estádio do Bonfim to intimidate Benfica after they recent loss there.

Lapping the first round only two points behind Porto, Benfica only lost two points from two draws in the final 19 matches, and won every game from match-day 23 to 34, including a title defining Clássico in Estádio das Antas. The match was highly controversial because of the war-like tactics that Porto employed: Rocks were thrown at the team bus; the players had to walk to the locker room between a corridor of angry Porto fans; the locker room was sprayed with a chemical that made it impossible to use, with Benfica being forced to get dressed in the access tunnel; the pitch was flooded to prevent the ball from rolling. Pinto da Costa allegedly said to Eriksson "Mr. Eriksson, I like you, but war is war". Despite this, Benfica won 2–0 with goals from César Brito and opened a three-point gap. A few days before, Porto had beat Benfica by 2–1 for the Portuguese Cup, eliminating them.

Despite a home draw with Sporting in the aftermath of the Clássico, Benfica did not let the title slip and on 26 May it won its 29th league title. William played every minute of the campaign, narrowly surpassing Rui Águas, who collected the Bola de Prata for his 25 league goals. According to Eriksson, he should have left then, on a high.

Competitions

Overall record

Primeira Divisão

League table

Results by round

Matches

Taça de Portugal

UEFA Cup

Friendlies

Player statistics
The squad for the season consisted of the players listed in the tables below, as well as staff member Sven-Goran Eriksson (manager) and Toni (assistant manager).

|}

Transfers

In

Out

Out by loan

Notes

References

Bibliography
 
 

S.L. Benfica seasons
Benfica
Portuguese football championship-winning seasons